Villalmanzo is a village and municipality of the province of Burgos, in the autonomous community of Castile and León, Spain.

References

External links
News about Villalmano 
Guide about Villalmanzo 
Peña PVM (Villalmanzo) 
 Forum about Villalmanzo 
News about Villalmanzo 
Villalmanzo.com/ www.villalmanzo.com 

Municipalities in the Province of Burgos